James Archibald Stuart-Wortley, PC, QC (3 July 1805 – 22 August 1881) was a British Conservative Party politician and the husband of the philanthropist Jane Stuart-Wortley.

Life
He was born in 1805, the youngest son of James Archibald Stuart-Wortley-Mackenzie, 1st Baron Wharncliffe. He was educated at Christ Church, Oxford and he became a barrister at the Inner Temple in 1831, rising to be a Queen's Counsel in 1841. He was a fellow of Merton College, Oxford.

He was elected at the 1835 general election  as Member of Parliament (MP) for Halifax, but was defeated at the 1837 general election.  He returned to the House of Commons in 1842, when he was elected at an unopposed by-election as MP  for Bute, and held that seat until 1859. At the 1859 general election he stood in the West Riding of Yorkshire, but did not win a seat.

In 1846, he was sworn a Privy Counsellor. He held office as Recorder of London from 1850 to 1856 and then as Solicitor General for England and Wales under Lord Palmerston from November 1856 until May 1857. He had to resign in 1858 due to spinal injuries sustained in a riding accident. He and his wife left their London home in Carlton House Terrace to live at East Sheen Lodge (which was renamed Wortley Lodge) near Mortlake until he became worse, forcing them to move back to London in 1869. Back in London his wife was able to delegate the care of her husband at least in part to their daughters.

Family 

On 6 May 1846 he married Jane Lawley (1820–1900), daughter of Lord Wenlock. She died at Ripley, Surrey, on 4 February 1900, aged 79. They had four sons and five daughters:
Mary Caroline Stuart-Wortley (10 May 1848 – 18 April 1941), married in London on 30 December 1880 Ralph King-Milbanke, 2nd Earl of Lovelace
Archibald John Stuart-Wortley (27 May 1849 – 11 October 1905), married in 1883 Eleanor Edith Bromley (d. 1939)
Charles Beilby Stuart-Wortley, 1st Baron Stuart of Wortley (15 September 1851 – 24 April 1926)
William Talbot Stuart-Wortley (27 Jan 1853 - 1863)
Margaret Jane Stuart-Wortley (21 Mar 1855 - 6 October 1937), married on 8 May 1877 Sir Reginald Talbot, son of Henry Chetwynd-Talbot, 18th Earl of Shrewsbury
Blanche Georgina Stuart-Wortley (18 Dec 1856 - 7 July 1931), married on 26 February 1895 Frederick Firebrace (d. 1917)
Caroline Susan Theodora Stuart-Wortley (15 Jun 1858 - 7 August 1940), married on 25 June 1881 Norman Grosvenor, son of Robert Grosvenor, 1st Baron Ebury
James Stuart-Wortley (27 Aug 1859 - 29 Apr 1863)
Katharine Sarah Stuart-Wortley (18 Sep 1860 - 27 March 1943), married on 1 October 1883 Gen. Sir Neville Lyttelton, son of George Lyttelton, 4th Baron Lyttelton

References

The photographs on this page are in The National Portrait Gallery and are listed as being JOHN Stuart-Wortley – 2nd Baron Wharncliffe (1801–1855)and his wife Georgina (née Ryder)

External links 
 

1805 births
1881 deaths
Alumni of Christ Church, Oxford
Members of the Inner Temple
British barristers
Fellows of Merton College, Oxford
Scottish Tory MPs (pre-1912)
Conservative Party (UK) MPs for English constituencies
Members of the Parliament of the United Kingdom for Scottish constituencies
Members of the Privy Council of the United Kingdom
UK MPs 1835–1837
UK MPs 1841–1847
UK MPs 1847–1852
UK MPs 1852–1857
UK MPs 1857–1859
Younger sons of barons
19th-century King's Counsel
Recorders of London
Solicitors General for England and Wales
James
Presidents of the Oxford Union